Sir William Frederick Cotton  (23 April 1928 – 11 August 2008) was a British television producer and executive, and the son of dance band leader Billy Cotton. The TV and radio presenter Fearne Cotton is related to him, as he was her paternal grandfather's cousin.

Early life

Following a secondary education at the independent school Ardingly College, he joined BBC Television as an in-house producer of light entertainment programmes in 1956, working on various programmes such as his father's Billy Cotton Band Show and popular music programme Six-Five Special.

Professional career
In 1970, Cotton was promoted to Head of Light Entertainment, following the death of Tom Sloan in May. In this position, Cotton was responsible for overseeing the production of a whole series of popular variety and light entertainment shows, including The Morecambe and Wise Show (1968–77), Monty Python's Flying Circus (1969–74), The Two Ronnies (1971–87), Bruce Forsyth and the Generation Game (first run 1971–77), Look: Mike Yarwood (1971-76) and Parkinson (TV series) (first run 1971-82). Cotton's era was generally seen as the most eclectic in the history of BBC Light Entertainment, with programmes such as Morecambe and Wise becoming icons of British popular culture and drawing huge audiences, while the more subversive Monty Python provided a more cutting-edge, contemporary and daring complement.

Cotton's success as Head of Light Entertainment led to his promotion to Controller of BBC1, the Corporation's premier and the UK's oldest television station, in 1977. He oversaw some of the channel's highest-ever audience figures in 1979, although this was mostly due to the main opposition, ITV, being on strike for over two months.

In 1981, he was replaced as controller of BBC1 by Alan Hart and made the BBC's deputy managing director of television under Alasdair Milne. In 1984 Cotton was promoted to become managing director of Television, a role he fulfilled until his retirement from the Corporation in 1988. During this final period at the BBC he was involved with Michael Grade and Jonathan Powell in the attempted cancellation of Doctor Who in 1985 after a run of 22 years on the BBC, a decision which became an 18-month hiatus following a tabloid backlash (the series wasn't completely axed until 1989). Cotton subsequently did some freelance executive producing work in the light entertainment area and served as chairman of Noel Gay Television. He was deputy chairman of Meridian Broadcasting from 1992 to 1996, then chairman until 2001.

Honours

Cotton was a Vice-President of the Marie Curie Cancer Care charity. He received a BAFTA Fellowship Award in 1998. He was made a Knight Bachelor for his services to Television Broadcasting and Marie Curie Cancer Care in 2001. He had previously been appointed a CBE in 1989 and an OBE in 1976.

He was the subject of This Is Your Life in 1995 when he was surprised by Michael Aspel at Castle Ashby in Northamptonshire. Guests included Paul Fox, Brian Tesler, Michael Grade, and Billy Marsh.

BBC Two broadcast an evening of programmes that he commissioned as part of a tribute night to him on Boxing Day 2008, including the Morecambe & Wise Christmas Show of 1971, The Generation Game Christmas Show of 1973, and The Two Ronnies Old Fashioned Christmas Mystery of 1973. There was also a documentary about his career with Michael Grade, Bruce Forsyth, Michael Parkinson, Ronnie Corbett, Terry Wogan, and Paul Jackson among those paying tribute, in addition to this a two-part documentary about his life and career was broadcast on BBC Radio 2 on New Year's Eve 2008 and New Year's Day 2009 presented by Paul O'Grady.

References

External links
 
 
 Sir Bill Cotton – Obituary from The Guardian

1928 births
2008 deaths
BBC One controllers
British television executives
BAFTA fellows
Commanders of the Order of the British Empire
Knights Bachelor
Morecambe and Wise
People educated at Ardingly College
20th-century British comedians
20th-century British businesspeople